Kenyan Americans are an ethnic group of Americans of Kenyan descent. As of the 2010 census, there were an estimated 92,638 Kenyan-born persons living in the United States. Most Kenyan Americans are concentrated in Minneapolis-St. Paul, Seattle, Texas, Maryland, Georgia, New York, North Carolina, and the greater Washington, D.C. area.

History
Restrictions against immigration from Asia and Africa  led to little voluntary immigration from Kenya until the latter half of the 20th century. Kenyan emigration to the United States then noted a large increase, nearly doubling from the decades before.

This increase was caused by several factors; political instability and a downturn in the economy in the 1980s in Kenya coupled with a high rate of unemployment (over 35 percent) led to a greater desire to immigrate. Some immigrants were also attracted to technology-oriented careers in the United States that boomed in availability in the 1990s and early 2000s.

Demography
Kenyan Americans come from ethnic groups such as the Kikuyu, Kisii, Luhya, Kamba, Kalenjin, Meru or Luo people.

The largest populations of Kenyans in the United States are found in Southern California, Massachusetts, and the greater Washington, D.C. area. Many Kenyans are also established in Georgia and North Carolina, states with important health care centers.

According to the 2010 census, approximately one-third of persons born in Kenya who are living in the US have become naturalized citizens.

African immigrants are among the most educated groups in the United States. Like their recent immigrant counterparts Kenyan Americans give a high value to education.

According to estimates from the Migration Policy Institute for 2015 to 2019, the total number of immigrants from Kenya in the USA was 141,800. The top counties of settlement were as follows:

1) Hennepin County, MN ------------------------ 6,900

2) King County, WA ------------------------------- 4,500

3) Tarrant County, TX ----------------------------- 4,400

4) Dallas County, TX ------------------------------ 3,700

5) Baltimore County, MD ----------------------- 3,000

6) Harris County, TX ------------------------------ 2,900

7) Los Angeles County, CA -------------------- 2,500

8) Franklin County, OH --------------------------- 2,500

9) Middlesex County, Mass.------------------- 2,400

10) Collin County, TX ----------------------------- 2,400

11) Pierce County, WA --------------------------- 2,200

12) Montgomery County, MD ---------------- 2,000

13) Cobb County, GA ----------------------------- 2,000

14) Ramsey County, MN ------------------------ 1,900

15) New Castle County, DE -------------------- 1,900

16) Maricopa County, AZ ---------------------- 1,800

17) Johnson County, KS ------------------------ 1,800

Organizations
Like other immigrant groups living in the US, Kenyan Americans have created many organizations. These include the Kenya Diaspora Advisory Council, the Kenya American Association, the Kenyan-Cincinnati Association ("kcaweb", whose goal is to facilitate Kenyan integration in social and cultural scopes in the tri-state area and promoting awareness of the culture of Kenya in the United States), the Minnesota Kenyan International Development Association ("MKIDA", formed in  2003, to improve education and the economy of the Kenyan Americans) and KACA (Kenyan Americans Community Association).

The American Kenyan Educational Corporation focuses on funding secondary school students and building schools in Kenya.

Notable people

  
Barack Obama, 44th President of the United States; born to a Kenyan father of Luo descent
Edi Gathegi, actor known for recurring character Dr. Jeffrey Cole (aka "Big Love") in the television series House, and as Laurent in the films Twilight and its sequel The Twilight Saga: New Moon
Bernard Lagat, athlete for Kenya, now representing the US (of Nandi Kalenjin descent)
Tom Morello, rock guitarist; of Kikuyu, Irish, and Italian descent
Liza Mucheru-Wisner, finalist on season 10 of reality show The Apprentice
Ben Mutua Jonathan Muriithi, also known as BMJ Muriithi, journalist and actor based in Atlanta, Georgia; works for Kenyan media company Nation Media Group
Isis Nyong'o, media and technology leader
Mubarak Muyika, Silicon-valley based Entrepreneur known for founding his first company at 16 and selling it two years later in a six figure deal.
Tavia Nyong'o, scholar and professor
David Otunga, professional wrestler for WWE
The Physics, hip hop group in Seattle, Washington; of Kenyan descent
Mwende Window Snyder, of (American-Kamba descent), computer software engineer; senior security project manager at Apple Inc.
Lupita Nyong'o, Kenyan actress and an Oscar recipient featured in the movie 12 Years a Slave, and many others
Lawrence Billy Jones III-FOX News Conservative commentator,ancestral great grandparents are of Kenyan descent
KayCyy, rapper, singer and songwriter; born in Nairobi

See also

Southeast Africans in the United States
Kenyan Canadians
Kenyans in Ireland
Kenyans in France
Kenyans in Italy
Kenyans in Switzerland
Kenyans in Germany
Kenyans in Belgium
Kenyans in the Netherlands
Kenyans in Denmark
Kenyans in Norway
Kenyans in Sweden
Kenyan Australians
Kenyan migration to the United Kingdom
Kenya–United States relations

References

Further reading
 Azevedo, Mario. Kenya: The Land, The People, and the Nation (Carolina Academic Press, 1993).
 Branch, Daniel. Kenya: Between Hope and Despair, 1963–2011 (Yale UP, 2011).
 Maxon, Robert M., and Thomas P. Ofcansky. Historical Dictionary of Kenya (2nd ed. Scarecrow Press, 2000).
 Rudolph, Laura C. "Kenyan Americans." Gale Encyclopedia of Multicultural America, edited by Thomas Riggs, (3rd ed., vol. 3, Gale, 2014, pp. 1–9). online

 
United States
Southeast Africans in the United States